Granville is an unincorporated community in Niles Township, Delaware County, Indiana.

History
Granville was founded in 1836. It was named for Granville Hastings, who held several area business interests.

Geography

References

Unincorporated communities in Delaware County, Indiana
Unincorporated communities in Indiana